Titanes de Tulancingo is a football club in the Mexican Football League Second Division in Tulancingo, Hidalgo, Mexico.

Current squad

Squad as current as May 20, 2012

Honors
Ascenso MX:

Apertura 2011, Clausura 2012

External links
Segunda División Profesional Website

References 

Football clubs in Hidalgo (state)